Paul Winfree is director of the Thomas A. Roe Institute for Economic Policy Studies and is also the Richard F. Aster Fellow at The Heritage Foundation. He is the founder and president of N58 Policy Research.  Winfree is Chair of the Fulbright Foreign Scholarship Board. He previously was Deputy Assistant to the President for Domestic policy, Deputy Director of the Domestic Policy Council, and Director of Budget Policy at the White House.

Education
Winfree is a graduate of George Mason University, from where he graduated with a Bachelor of Science degree in Economics. Afterwards, he completed a Master’s program at the London School of Economics and Political Science, focusing on Economics and Economic History. He was enrolled as a PhD student at London School of Economics when he was drawn to applying economics to public policy.

Career

In 2006, Winfree took a job at The Heritage Foundation, where he researched issues of economic mobility and coauthored a book on that topic published by the Pew Charitable Trusts. 

Between 2011 and 2015, Winfree was director of income security at the Senate Budget Committee. In this capacity, he contributed greatly to implementing deficit-neutral risk corridor legislation in the Affordable Care Act.

In 2015, Winfree returned to The Heritage Foundation, serving as Director of the Thomas A. Roe Institute for Economic Policy Studies, the Center for Data Analysis, as well as becoming the inaugural Richard F. Aster Fellow. His research there focused on public finance, economic modeling, and the history of economic thought. In this capacity, he was lead-authoring the 165-page "Blueprint for Balance" proposal, which later became an important idea-giver for the Trump transition team, of which Winfree eventually became a part of.

During the 2016 Presidential transition, Winfree worked alongside Linda M. Springer, a member of the George W. Bush administration, looking forward to achieve a more direct political impact. In November 2016, he stated that President-elect Trump was highly interested in questions of domestic policy.

Winfree became the Deputy Assistant to the President for Domestic Policy, the Deputy Director of the Domestic Policy Council, and the Director of Budget Policy in January 2017. Winfree and former Representative OMB Director, Mick Mulvaney, were lead authors of the administration’s budget proposition.

Winfree also authored and lead the administration of the President’s Executive Order number 13781, with the objective of establishing "A Comprehensive Plan for Reorganizing the Executive Branch." Winfree was also the author of the Executive Order number 13828 on "Reducing poverty in America by promoting opportunity and economic mobility."

Paul Winfree left the White House and returned to Heritage at the end of 2017, in a move which was anticipated by media and policy experts in Washington, who saw him as well as several other early members of the Trump administration leave after one year in office.
Paul Winfree also was founder and president of N58 Policy Research, a firm that provided analytical research and strategy for decision makers in matters of public policy.

Personal background
Winfree is from Williamsburg, Virginia, where he once worked as a cooper's apprentice at the colonial town's historical district. He is married and has two sons.

References

External links
 Biography at the Heritage Foundation

The Heritage Foundation
Trump administration personnel
George Mason University alumni
Alumni of the London School of Economics
American magazine publishers (people)
American newspaper publishers (people)
People from Williamsburg, Virginia
Living people
Year of birth missing (living people)